Severian is the narrator and main character of Gene Wolfe's novels The Book of the New Sun and The Urth of the New Sun.

Severian, Severians or Severianus may also refer to:

Severian Baranyk (1889–1941), Ukrainian Greek Catholic priest and martyr in Ukraine
Severian Encratites, a sect of gnostic Encratites
Severian of Gabala (fl. c. 400), a popular preacher in Constantinople
Severian Yakymyshyn (1930–2021), Ukrainian Greek Catholic priest in Canada
Severians, a tribe or tribal union of early East Slavs
Severia, historical region in Eastern Europe
Severianus, son of the emperor Valerius Severus (died 313)
Severianus, Bishop of Scythopolis (died 453), bishop of Scythopolis in Palestine and martyr
Severianus of Damascus (fl. c. 450–480), Roman governor
Severian, Christian martyr torn apart by stones around 300
Severian, one of the Forty Martyrs of Sebaste (died 320)
Severians, the followers of Severus of Antioch

See also
 Severin (disambiguation)